Staza is a village in central Croatia, in the municipality of Sunja, Sisak-Moslavina County. It is located in the Banija region.

History

Demographics
According to the 2011 census, the village of Staza has 220 inhabitants. This represents 57.89% of its pre-war population.
According to the 1991 census, 93.68% of the village population were ethnic Croats (356/380).

Notable natives and residents

References 

Populated places in Sisak-Moslavina County